Franklin Lynch (born  July 21, 1955) is an American serial killer who is currently housed at San Quentin State Prison's death row. Convicted of the murders of three elderly women in successive months during the summer of 1987, Lynch is the prime suspect in 10 other murders of elderly women that took place in San Leandro, which were called publicly as "The Day Stalker Murders". Circumstantial evidence links him to a total of 13 murders.

Biography 
Lynch was born on July 21, 1955 in Alameda County, California. In his teen years he began taking drugs, which developed into cocaine addiction. He was arrested multiple times for robbery and had served multiple years in a state prison.

Investigation 
In September 1987, the San Leandro Police Department (SLPD) formed their investigation into solving a string of recent brutal attacks and murders targeted towards elderly women whilst they were in their home. Prior to their investigation they started examining the details of recent murders to see if they could be connected to any other cases. The investigation formed when they came to the conclusion that a serial killer was targeting elderly white women who were either widowed or living alone.            
The murders had a pattern, the women would be in their home when an intruder forced himself into the home and attacked the woman, beating them to death. The murders had also all happened in San Leandro. 

Despite targeting a certain type of woman, he never sexually assaulted any of them, but money and expensive valuables were taken from the home, and police believed that was the motive for the murders. By early October, the killer was linked to up to 13 murders, with the most recent only being in late August. The killer was also suspected of over two-dozen robberies and attacks on elderly women dating back to 1980. The killer was dubbed the Day Stalker, due to his nature of striking at around mid-day hours. Some names that were victimized by the killer include: Pearl Larson (aged 76), Norma Marglon (aged 78), Adeline Figuerido (aged 89), Anna Constantin (aged 73), Agnes George (aged 74), Marie Lovardi (aged 82).          

In late October, the investigators were notified by neighbors of 32-year-old Franklin Lynch, an ex-convict who had previously served time for robbery and drug charges. Lynch was taken into custody and after a search of his home, items were found that belonged to Pearl Larson, the first victim of the Day Stalker. In a further search, items were found that also belonged to victims Adeline Figuerido and Anna Constantine.

Conviction and later appeals 
Franklin Lynch was convicted of the three murders and two separate attacks that were non-fatal, and he was sentenced to death in 1992. He was soon transferred to San Quentin State Prison to await his execution.

In 2004 he tried to appeal his sentence, and he argued he should have been able to represent himself. The appeal stated that Lynch's conviction should be overturned, as he claimed there were numerous errors that occurred at trial between the jury and the judge. He also argued that California's death penalty law is unconstitutional and violates international law. However, his appeal was rejected, and as of September 2021, he remains on death row in San Quentin.

See also
 List of death row inmates in the United States
 List of serial killers in the United States

References 

1987 murders in the United States
1955 births
20th-century African-American people
20th-century American criminals
African-American people
American male criminals
American people convicted of murder
American prisoners sentenced to death
American serial killers
Criminals of the San Francisco Bay Area
Living people
Male serial killers
People convicted of murder by California
Prisoners sentenced to death by California